Laibachkunstderfuge (always written as a whole word but sometimes dividing it with colors as Lai-Bach-Kunst-der-Fuge) is a concept album by NSK industrial group Laibach. The album is a reinterpretation («the laibachian interpretation») of Johann Sebastian Bach's The Art of Fugue (Die Kunst der Fuge in German).

Track listing
 "Contrapunctus 1" - (3:07)
 "Contrapunctus 2" - (20:52)
 "Contrapunctus 3" - (2:54)
 "Contrapunctus 4" - (5:17)
 "Contrapunctus 5" - (2:46)
 "Contrapunctus 6, a 4 im Stile francese" - (4:11)
 "Contrapunctus 7, a 4 per Augment et Diminut" - (1:21)
 "Contrapunctus 8, a 3" - (7:31)
 "Contrapunctus 9, a 4 alla Duodecima" - (8:26)
 "Contrapunctus 10 a 4 alla Decima" - (6:15)
 "Contrapunctus 11, a 4" - (2:02)
 "Contrapunctus 12, Canon alla Ottava" - (4:22)
 "Contrapunctus 13, Canon alla Duodecima in Contrapuncto alla Quinta" - (4:46)
 "Contrapunctus 15, canon per Augmentationem in Contrario Motu" - (5:22)

References

Laibach (band) albums
2008 albums
Mute Records albums
Concept albums
Recordings of Johann Sebastian Bach